Franco Davín (born January 11, 1970) is a tennis coach and a former tennis player from Argentina.

Davín won his first ATP-tour match at 15 years, 1 month against Hans Gildemeister in Buenos Aires. He holds the Open Era record for being the youngest player to win a tour level main draw match. Davín won three singles tournaments on the ATP Tour, and reached a career-high singles ranking of World No. 30 in October 1990.

He coached fellow countryman Juan Martín del Potro until July 2015, and was the captain of the Argentine Davis Cup team. Under Davín's tutelage, Del Potro won the 2009 US Open, defeating Rafael Nadal in the semi-finals and Roger Federer in the final en route to the championship. Davín also coached Gastón Gaudio when he won the 2004 French Open and Grigor Dimitrov from 2015 to 2016. He is currently coaching Brandon Nakashima.

Tennis career

Juniors
Davín had an excellent junior career, reaching the US Open Boys' Singles final and winning the French Open Boys' Doubles (both in 1986).

Pro tour
Turning professional in 1987, Davín's best slam performance was reaching the quarterfinals of the 1991 French Open, where he defeated experienced clay-courter Martín Jaite as well as Christian Bergström, Marián Vajda and Arnaud Boetsch en route before losing to Michael Stich.

Coaching
In addition to working with Gaudio, del Potro, and Dimitrov, Davín has mentored Guillermo Coria, Fabio Fognini, Kyle Edmund From November 2020 until 2021, he coached Cristian Garín. He is currently coaching Brandon Nakashima.

Personal life 
Davín resides in Key Biscayne with his wife Mariana, his daughter Juana, and his son Nacho.

In June 2020, Davín tested positive for COVID-19.

Junior Grand Slam finals

Singles: 1 (1 runner-up)

Doubles: 1 (1 runner-up)

ATP career finals

Singles: 9 (3 titles, 6 runner-ups)

ATP Challenger and ITF Futures finals

Singles: 6 (4–2)

Doubles: 1 (0–1)

Performance timeline

Singles

Notes

References

External links
 
 
 

1970 births
Argentine male tennis players
French Open junior champions
Living people
Sportspeople from Buenos Aires Province
Argentine tennis coaches
Grand Slam (tennis) champions in boys' doubles